Bernard Sta Maria (194430 July 1987) was a Malaysian politician, community leader and author. He was a member of the Legislative Assembly.

A member of the Democratic Action Party, he was first elected to the Malacca State Legislative Assembly in May 1969 making him the youngest elected State assemblyman. Re-elected for the second term and the third term in the state constituency of Banda Hilir, Malacca. Represented the State of Malacca at the Commonwealth Parliamentary Conference at Suva, Fiji in 1981.

He was the founder of the Malacca Portuguese Cultural Society in 1967. Founder of the Educacao Tutorial Services in 1979. Written extensively on the  Malacca Portuguese Culture and revived the once dormant

He visited Portuguese communities in Portugal, Australia and Hawaii. He published his first book in 1976 The Golden Son Of The Kadazan a biography of Peter Mojuntin, a Kadazan community leader. His second book My People My Country was published in 1981. It's about the story of the Malacca Portuguese community. It traces the community's beginning during the Portuguese rule in Malacca 1511–1641, it relates their resistance and defiance against the Dutch persecution, 1641–1824, it describes the community's contribution in the formation of Malay during the British colonisation, 1824–1957, it reveals the atrocities the community suffered during the Japanese war in Malaya, the community's quest for representation in an Independent Malaysia and their propensity to survive and propagate their language, tradition, religion and culture.

He visited Portugal to witness the signing of the twin city agreement between Lisbon and the state of Malacca in 1984. Delivered his last official speech at the Portuguese community conference in Macau in 1986, titled "The Scope and Dimension of Portuguese Consciousness In The Far East"

He died from serious bronchitis at age 43, in Malacca on 30 July 1987.

References 

1944 births
1987 deaths
Malaysian people of Kristang descent
Malaysian people of Portuguese descent
Democratic Action Party (Malaysia) politicians
Members of the Malacca State Legislative Assembly
Deaths from bronchitis